In Case of Adversity is a 1958 French crime film directed by Claude Autant-Lara, starring Jean Gabin, Brigitte Bardot and Edwige Feuillère. It was released as Love Is My Profession in the United States. It tells the story of a married lawyer who rigs a trial to acquit a young female criminal he has become obsessed with, even to the point of imagining they might have a life together and start a family. The screenplay was written by Jean Aurenche and Pierre Bost after the novel In Case of Emergency by Georges Simenon. The film was released in France on 17 September 1958.

Plot
A petty criminal aged 22, the attractive Yvette is caught after robbing a watchmaker's shop with a toy pistol and felling his old wife. To defend her, she asks for André Gobillot, a leading member of the Paris bar. Telling him she has no money to pay him, she lifts her skirt to show him her goods. Accepting the deal, he arranges a false witness and after getting her acquitted instals her in a small hotel.

His childless wife Viviane realises what is happening but hopes the improbable affair will not last. Knowing nothing about the girl, Gobillot has first to wean her off drink and drugs. He also doesn't know that she is still entertaining her current lover, an impoverished medical student called Mazetti. As Gobillot's obsession grows, his wife gets more alarmed and an enquiry is opened into his bribing the witness who lied.

When Yvette tells him she is pregnant, he is overjoyed and books a holiday for the two of them. Before they leave, Yvette cannot resist one last visit to Mazetti's sordid room where, enraged with jealousy, he cuts her throat. It is not stated whether Gobillot's wife will take him back or if he will still be able to practise law.

Cast
 Jean Gabin as Maître André Gobillot
 Brigitte Bardot as Yvette Maudet
 Edwige Feuillère as Viviane Gobillot
 Nicole Berger as Janine
 Madeleine Barbulée as Bordenave
 Gabrielle Fontan as Mme Langlois
 Jacques Clancy as Duret
 Annick Allières as Noémie
 Franco Interlenghi as Mazetti

Reception
"Something is obviously missing in the French film that has been made from Georges Simenon's weirdly off-beat novel", wrote Bosley Crowther of The New York Times. He continued: "There are elements for shattering drama here. Yet, strangely, it doesn't develop. It all moves along in the groove of conventional nonconformance with the obvious social rules." Crowther called Autant-Lara "one of the best directors in France", but wrote that Bardot's performance "falls far short" and that "Jean Gabin misses, too".

François Truffaut called it one of Autant-Lara's best films and compared it to the plays of Jean Anouilh, noting:We come out of it with a mixture of disgust and admiration, a sense of satisfaction that is real enough but incomplete. It is 100 percent French, with all the virtues and vices that implies: an analysis that is at once subtle and narrow, a skill that is mixed with spitefulness, a spirit of unflinching observation directed at the sordid, and talented sleight-of hand that delivers a liberal message in the end. He described how the film contrasts the scene where Bardot's character robs a backstreet watchmender's shop  with the ceremonial on the same day of Queen Elizabeth II's state visit to Paris:It's the girl who interests us and preoccupies us, not an anachronistic queen. It is precisely because Bardot is a girl who represents her time absolutely faithfully that she is more famous than any queen or princess … And it's why En Cas des Malheur is her best film since And God Created Woman — an anti-Sabrina, anti-Roman Holiday, anti-Anastasia movie that is truly republican.

Box office
The film was thirteenth most popular film of 1958 in France, recording admissions of 3,152,082.

References

External links
 
Review of film at DVD Talk

1958 drama films
1958 films
Adultery in films
Films based on Belgian novels
Films based on works by Georges Simenon
Films directed by Claude Autant-Lara
French drama films
1950s legal films
Films with screenplays by Jean Aurenche
Films with screenplays by Pierre Bost
1950s French films